The Sacramento State Hornets men's basketball team is the basketball team that represents California State University, Sacramento in Sacramento, California. Members of the Big Sky Conference since 1996, the Hornets have yet to play in the NCAA Division I Tournament or the National Invitation Tournament (NIT). They are currently coached by David Patrick, who took over in 2022.

Postseason

CIT results
The Hornets have appeared in the CollegeInsider.com Postseason Tournament (CIT) once, with a record of 1–1.

NCAA Division II Tournament results
The Hornets appeared in the NCAA Division II Tournament four times, with a combined record of 4–7.

Notable players

Joshua Patton (born 1997), basketball player in the Israeli Basketball Premier League

References

External links